Rune Lindblad (12 May 1923, in Gothenburg – 5 May 1991) was a Swedish composer of musique concrète and electronic music, and visual artist.

Career
He first began composing in 1953 and composed over 200 works.

His first piece, "Party", is considered the first electroacoustic work created in Sweden.

For three years he experimented with optics and sound, and produced five works using over 1800 meters of film.

On 14 February 1957, Lindblad, Sven-Eric Johansson, and Bruno Epstein put on the first concert of concrète and electronic music in Sweden at the Folkets hus in Gothenburg. The audience responded poorly and demanded refunds, critics referred to the music as "pure torture".

As a visual artist, he created paintings, drawings, etchings, collages, woodcuts, etc. Some of which adorn his albums.

Lindblad taught at University of Gothenburg, his students included Rolf Enström, Åke Parmerud, and Ulf Bilting.

Discography
Predestination (1975), Proprius
Rune Lindblad (1988), Radium 226.05
Death of the Moon and Other Early Works (1989), Pogus Productions
Death of the Moon: Electronic & Concrète Music (1953-1960) (1997), Pogus – reissue of earlier LP with additional material from Radium LP
Objekt 2: Electronic & Concrète Music (1962-1988) (1998), Pogus – includes remaining material from Radium LP
Die stille Liebe (2003) Elektron

References

1923 births
1991 deaths
20th-century classical composers
20th-century Swedish painters
Swedish male painters
Electroacoustic music composers
Experimental composers
People from Gothenburg
Swedish classical composers
Swedish male classical composers
Swedish printmakers
Academic staff of the University of Gothenburg
20th-century printmakers
20th-century Swedish male musicians
20th-century Swedish musicians
20th-century Swedish male artists
21st-century Swedish male artists